The 2005 Oceania Cup was an international rugby union competition for countries and territories from Oceania with national teams in the developmental band. It was run by the Federation of Oceania Rugby Unions, which is the administrative body for rugby in the Oceania region.

The tournament, won by the Cook Islands, also served as the first two rounds of the Oceania qualification for 2007 Rugby World Cup.

First round

Pool A 

Ranking:
 1.   qualified for final 
 2. 
 3.

Pool B 

Ranking:
 1.   qualified for final 
 2. 
 3.

Finals 

Cook Islands won on aggregate (48-32) and was also admitted to Round four of Oceania qualification for 2007 RWC.

See also
 FORU Oceania Cup

FORU Oceania Cup
South American
Rugby